Roba is a Finnish police drama television series directed by Joona Tena and Aleksi Mäkelä. Roba follows the daily life of Helsinki Police Department's uniformed police unit. The series stars Kari Hietalahti, Aku Hirviniemi, Aarni Kivinen, Leena Pöysti, Riku Nieminen, and Tiina Lymi.

The first season aired on MTV3 in autumn 2012, the second in autumn 2015, and the third season appeared in autumn 2016. The fourth season aired in 2019.

Cast and characters
Kari Hietalahti as Seargent Arto Mäkelä
Aarni Kivinen as Chief Inspector Heikki "Hessu" Rantaniva (series 1–2)
Aku Hirviniemi as Police Officer Jani Sjöberg
Leena Pöysti as Police Officer Maikki Kurkela
Riku Nieminen as Police Officer Pekka Myllymies
Mari Perankoski as Detective Elina Sinisalo
Ilari Johansson as Detective Markus Uusitalo
Rauno Ahonen as Service Duty Officer, Seargent Niilo Kobra
Tiina Lymi as Chief Inspector Taru Valtonen (series 2–3)
Markus Järvenpää as Juha Sjöberg
Esa Latva-Äijö as Jukka Puustinen

References

External links

Finnish television shows
2012 Finnish television series debuts
MTV3 original programming